The Kasagh Basilica (Քասաղի բազիլիկա), formally known as the Holy Cross Church (Սուրբ Խաչ եկեղեցի, Surb Khach yekeghetsi),  is an early medieval Armenian church in the town of Aparan in the Aragatsotn Province of Armenia. It is dated by scholars to the fourth or fifth century. It was originally within the grounds of the Arsacid (Arshakuni) dynasty palace. The church was partly restored in 1877.

Gallery

See also
List of the oldest churches

References 

Armenian Apostolic churches in Armenia
4th-century churches
Churches in Aragatsotn Province
Tourist attractions in Aragatsotn Province